FK Blansko is a professional Czech football club located in Blansko in the South Moravian Region. The club plays in the Czech National Football League.

The team's success in recent history was earning promotion to the Czech National Football League.

Players

Current squad
.

References

External links
 Official website 

Football clubs in the Czech Republic
Blansko District
Association football clubs established in 2004